Colonel Owen Bartley Philp, CM, DFC, CD (25 December 1923 – 15 April 1995) was a Canadian air force officer who was instrumental in the formation of the Golden Centennaires aerobatic team, commanded the Golden Centennaires, and was founder of the Snowbirds aerobatic team. Philp was made a Member of the Order of Canada in October 1992 and was inducted into the Canadian Aviation Hall of Fame in 2015.

References

 Milberry, Larry, ed. Sixty Years: The RCAF and CF Air Command 1924–1984. Toronto: Canav Books, 1984. .
 Dempsey, Daniel V. A Tradition of Excellence: Canada's Airshow Team Heritage. Victoria, BC: High Flight Enterprises, 2002. .
 Air Force Magazine Vol 39/No.2, 2015

1995 deaths
Royal Canadian Air Force officers
Recipients of the Distinguished Flying Cross (United Kingdom)
1923 births
Canadian Aviation Hall of Fame inductees